Phyllochaetopterus is a genus of marine polychaete worms that live in tubes that they construct.

Species
The World Register of Marine Species lists the following species as being in the genus:

Phyllochaetopterus aciculigerus Crossland, 1904
Phyllochaetopterus anglicus Potts, 1914
Phyllochaetopterus arabicus Grube, 1870
Phyllochaetopterus bhaudi Jirkov, 2001
Phyllochaetopterus claparedii McIntosh, 1885
Phyllochaetopterus elioti Crossland, 1903
Phyllochaetopterus gardineri Crossland, 1904
Phyllochaetopterus gigas Nishi & Rouse, 2014
Phyllochaetopterus gracilis Grube, 1863
Phyllochaetopterus herdmani (Hornell in Willey, 1905)
Phyllochaetopterus lauensis Nishi & Rouse, 2007
Phyllochaetopterus limicolus Hartman, 1960
Phyllochaetopterus major Claparède, 1869
Phyllochaetopterus monroi Hartman, 1967
Phyllochaetopterus polus Morineaux Nishi Ormos & Mouchel, 2010
Phyllochaetopterus prolifica Potts, 1914
Phyllochaetopterus ramosus Willey, 1905
Phyllochaetopterus sibogae Caullery, 1944
Phyllochaetopterus socialis Claparède, 1869
Phyllochaetopterus verrilli Treadwell, 1943

References

Canalipalpata
Polychaete genera